Pythagoras tree may refer to:

 Tree of primitive Pythagorean triples
 Pythagoras tree (fractal)